Birte Siech (born 19 March 1967 in East Berlin) is a German rower.

References 
 
 

1967 births
Living people
East German female rowers
German female rowers
Rowers from Berlin
People from East Berlin
Rowers at the 1988 Summer Olympics
Rowers at the 1992 Summer Olympics
Olympic gold medalists for East Germany
Olympic bronze medalists for Germany
Olympic rowers of Germany
Olympic rowers of East Germany
Olympic medalists in rowing
World Rowing Championships medalists for East Germany
Medalists at the 1992 Summer Olympics
Medalists at the 1988 Summer Olympics